KWBE (1450 AM, "Beatrice Radio 1450") is a radio station broadcasting a classic hits format. Licensed to Beatrice, Nebraska, United States, the station is currently owned by Mike Flood through Flood Communications of Beatrice, LLC, and features programming from Westwood One.

References

External links

WBE
Gage County, Nebraska
Classic hits radio stations in the United States